Wiskott-Aldrich syndrome protein family member 2 is a protein that in humans is encoded by the WASF2 gene.

This gene encodes a member of the Wiskott-Aldrich syndrome protein family. The gene product is a protein that forms a multiprotein complex that links receptor kinases and actin. Binding to actin occurs through a C-terminal verprolin homology domain in all family members. The multiprotein complex serves to tranduce signals that involve changes in cell shape, motility or function. The published map location has been changed based on recent genomic sequence comparisons, which indicate that the expressed gene is located on chromosome 1, and a pseudogene may be located on chromosome X.

Interactions
WASF2 has been shown to interact with BAIAP2.

References

Further reading

External links